György Pálfi (born 11 April 1974 in Budapest, Hungary) is a Hungarian filmmaker. His film Taxidermia was screened in the Un Certain Regard section at the 2006 Cannes Film Festival.

Pálfi's films have received numerous awards and nominations. At the 2002 European Film Awards, he won the European Discovery/Fassbinder Award for his début film Hukkle. At Les Arcs European Film Festival in 2014, Pálfi won the first annual ARTE International Prize for the best project in development, The Voice, about a son searching for his father, a scientist who went missing 30 years ago.

Two of Pálfi's films have been Hungary's submission for the Academy Award for Best Foreign Language Film: Hukkle and Taxidermia.

He was a TorinoFilmLab Script&Pitch participant with his project The Voice.

Perpetuity, his latest movie was in the official selection of PÖFF Tallinn Black Nights Film Festival in 2021.

Filmography

Feature films
 Hukkle (2002)
 Taxidermia (2006)
 Nem vagyok a barátod / I Am Not Your Friend (2009)
 Final Cut: Hölgyeim és uraim / Final Cut: Ladies and Gentlemen (2012)
 Free Fall (2014)
 His Master's Voice (2018)
 Perpetuity (2021)

Short films
 A hal (1997)
 Jött egy busz... (2003) segment "Táltosember"
 Nem leszek a barátod (documentary short, 2009)
 Magyarország 2011 / Hungary 2011 (2011) segment

Television series
 Valaki kopog (television series, 2000) 1 episode
 Született lúzer (television series, 2008) 2 episodes

References

External links

 

1974 births
Living people
European Film Awards winners (people)
Hungarian film directors
Hungarian Jews
Best Director International Eurasia Award winners